"Beyond This Place" is a 1957 American television adaptation from A. J. Cronin's 1950 novel Beyond This Place.  It is a live television production, possibly preserved on kinescope. The show was directed by Sidney Lumet and produced by David Susskind.  It was the third episode of the first season of The DuPont Show of the Month, which was broadcast on CBS.  The dramatization starred Farley Granger, Peggy Ann Garner, Torin Thatcher, Max Adrian, Brian Donlevy, and Shelley Winters.

Cast
Farley Granger as Paul Burgess
Peggy Ann Garner as Lena Anderson
Hurd Hatfield as Oswald
Ruth White as Mrs. Burgess
Torin Thatcher as Rees Mathry
Max Adrian as Sir Matthew Sprott
Brian Donlevy as Constable Dale
Shelley Winters as Louisa Burt
Farrell Pelly as Prusty
Eduard Franz as Dunn
Fritz Weaver as Charlie Castle

External links 
Beyond This Place on TV.com

Television shows based on British novels
American live television shows
1950s American drama television series
Television shows based on works by A. J. Cronin
Television shows directed by Sidney Lumet
1957 American television episodes